William Shuttleworth (1868–1929) was an English footballer who played in the Football League for Accrington.

References

1868 births
1929 deaths
English footballers
Association football midfielders
English Football League players
Accrington F.C. players